Wang To-far (born 10 April 1948) is a Taiwanese economist and politician.

Career
Wang earned his bachelor's degree in economics by attending night school at National Chung Hsing University's Taipei campus. He then pursued further study in the subject at the University of California, Santa Barbara, where he obtained master's and doctoral degrees. Upon his return to Taiwan, Wang taught at his alma mater. He was a member of the Legislative Yuan from 2005 to 2008, and served on the legislature's Procedure Committee. Upon leaving the Legislative Yuan, Wang resumed teaching.

Political stances
Wang is against use of nuclear power, and has backed legislation to reduce greenhouse gas emissions, as well as further investment in water management. In comments on the energy sector in Taiwan, Wang has pushed for the breakup of a monopoly belonging to the state-run Taiwan Power Company. He believes that setting quotas for the production of renewable energy is inefficient and insufficient.

Wang has called for the enforcement of regulations on the Cross-Strait economic relationship, opposing concentrated and continual investment in China without safeguards. He has advocated that the government support technological research and development. Wang himself is supportive of the 908 Taiwan Republic Campaign.

Wang has been critical of policies put forth by the Ma Ying-jeou presidential administration, many of which are against Wang's political positions. He said that a budget proposed by the Executive Yuan in 2009 would likely be used to invest in local political factions that would indirectly solicit votes for the Kuomintang at later dates instead. He strongly denounced the Economic Cooperation Framework Agreement, stating that the agreement was "a contract to sell out Taiwan" serving as "a short cut to political unification." In 2012, Wang described the Ma administration's Economic Power-up Plan as "complicated and nigh incomprehensible." The next year, Wang said of the Ma administration, "What we are facing is an evil, cold-blooded and shameless government" due to their support of the Lungmen Nuclear Power Plant project.

References

1948 births
Living people
20th-century Taiwanese economists
Taiwanese anti–nuclear power activists
Democratic Progressive Party Members of the Legislative Yuan
National Taipei University alumni
University of California, Santa Barbara alumni
Members of the 6th Legislative Yuan
Party List Members of the Legislative Yuan
21st-century Taiwanese economists